Taipe Vave 'Isitolo is a Tongan former rugby union player who played as fullback.

Career
Before starting his rugby union career, 'Isitolo was part of the Tonga national football team which visited Bergamo in 1991 to play three matches against Atalanta.

'Isitolo debuted for Tonga on 3 June 1995, during the pool stage match of the 1995 Rugby World Cup against Ivory Coast in Rustenburg, being his only appearance in the tournament. His last cap for Tonga was on 15 July 1995 against Fiji in Suva.

References

External links
Taipe Isitolo international statistics

Date of birth missing (living people)
Tongan rugby union players
Rugby union fullbacks
Tonga international rugby union players
Living people
Year of birth missing (living people)